is metro station located in Tsuzuki Ward, Yokohama, Kanagawa Prefecture, Japan. It is served by the Yokohama Municipal Subway’s  Green Line (Line 4) and is 8.8 kilometers from the terminus of the Green Line at Nakayama Station.

History
Higashi-Yamata Station opened on March 30, 2008 when the Green Line started operation.

Lines 
Yokohama Municipal Subway
Green Line

Station layout
Higashi-Yamata Station has a single underground island platform serving two tracks.

Platforms

References
 Harris, Ken and Clarke, Jackie. Jane's World Railways 2008-2009. Jane's Information Group (2008).

External links
 Takata Station (Japanese)

Railway stations in Kanagawa Prefecture
Railway stations in Japan opened in 2008
Green Line (Yokohama)